Simon Zahner (born 8 March 1983 in Bubikon) is a Swiss former professional road and cyclo-cross cyclist.

Major results

Road

2004
2nd Time trial, National Under-23 Road Championships
2005
2nd Time trial, National Under-23 Road Championships
2006
3rd Time trial, National Road Championships
2007
2nd Time trial, National Road Championships
2008
7th Overall Tour Alsace
2009
1st  Overall Flèche du Sud
1st Stage 2
1st  Overall Tour Alsace
8th Grand Prix of Aargau Canton
9th Overall Grand Prix Tell
2010
2nd Road race, National Road Championships
2013
1st Stage 4 Tour Alsace
2014
2nd Tour de Berne
4th Time trial, National Road Championships
2016
8th Tour de Berne

Cyclo-cross

2000–2001
 2nd National Junior Championships
2002–2003
 2nd National Under-23 Championships
2003–2004
 1st  National Under-23 Championships
2004–2005
 UCI Under-23 World Cup
1st Nommay
 2nd National Under-23 Championships
 3rd  UCI Under-23 World Championships
2005–2006
 2nd National Championships
2006–2007
 2nd National Championships
 2nd Radquer Wetzikon
2007–2008
 1st Cyclo-cross International Aigle
 1st Rennaz-Noville
 1st Int. Radquer Fehraltorf
2008–2009
 1st Internationales Radquer Meilen
 2nd National Championships
2009–2010
 1st Flüuger-Quer
2011–2012
 2nd National Championships
 2nd Bussnang
 3rd Internationales Radquer Steinmaur
 10th UCI World Championships
2012–2013
 1st Frankfurter Rad-Cross
 2nd National Championships
 2nd Internationales Radquer Steinmaur
 2nd Bussnang
 UCI World Cup
3rd Hoogerheide
 3rd GP-5-Sterne-Region
 3rd Flückiger Cross Madiswil
 3rd Aigle
 3rd Radcross Illnau
2013–2014
 2nd GP-5-Sterne-Region
 2nd GGEW City Cross Cup
 2nd Int. Radquerfeldein GP Lambach
 3rd National Championships
 3rd Flückiger Cross Madiswil
2014–2015
 EKZ CrossTour
2nd Eschenbach
 2nd GGEW City Cross Cup
 3rd Internationales Radquer Steinmaur
 3rd Radcross Illnau
2015–2016
 2nd Internationales Radquer Steinmaur
 2nd Sion-Valais
 EKZ CrossTour
3rd Hittnau
 3rd GGEW City Cross Cup
 3rd Radcross Illnau
2016–2017
 2nd Internationales Radquer Steinmaur
 3rd Nyon
 9th UCI World Championships
2017–2018
 2nd National Championships
 EKZ CrossTour
2nd Bern
2nd Aigle
 3rd Radcross Illnau
 3rd Sion-Valais
2018–2019
 2nd Internationales Radquer Steinmaur
 3rd Flückiger Cross Madiswil
2019–2020
 Toi Toi Cup
2nd Uničov

References

External links

1983 births
Living people
Swiss male cyclists
People from Hinwil District
Cyclists at the 2015 European Games
European Games competitors for Switzerland
Cyclo-cross cyclists
Sportspeople from the canton of Zürich
21st-century Swiss people